The Château de Compiègne is a French château, a royal residence built for Louis XV and restored by Napoleon. Compiègne was one of three seats of royal government, the others being Versailles and Fontainebleau. It is located in Compiègne in the Oise department and is open to the public.

History
Even before the château was constructed, Compiègne was the preferred summer residence for French monarchs, primarily for hunting given its proximity to Compiègne Forest.

The first royal residence was built in 1374 for Charles V, and a long procession of successors both visited it and modified it. Louis XIV resided in Compiègne some 75 times. Louis XV was perhaps even more favorably impressed; the Comte de Chevergny described his infatuation: 
"Hunting was his main passion... and Compiègne, with its immense forest, with its endless avenues amongst the trees, with its stretches down which you could ride all day and never come to the end, was the ideal place to indulge that passion."

In 1750, prominent architect Ange-Jacques Gabriel proposed a thorough renovation of the chateau. Work began in 1751 and was finished in 1788 by Gabriel's student Le Dreux de La Châtre. It is neoclassical in style, with simplicity and clarity governing both its external and interior features.

During the French Revolution, the château passed into the jurisdiction of the Minister for the Interior. In 1795 all furniture was sold and its works of art were sent to the Muséum Central; it was essentially gutted.

19th-century
Napoleon visited in 1799 and again in 1803. In 1804 the château became an imperial domain and in 1807, he ordered it to be made habitable again. Architects Berthault, Percier and Fontaine, decorators Dubois and Redouté, and cabinetmakers Jacob-Desmalter and Marcion restored the château. Its layout was altered, a ballroom added, and the garden was replanted and linked directly to the forest.

The result is an example of First French Empire style (1808-1810), though some traces of the earlier décor survive. The writer Auguste Luchet remarked that "Compiègne speaks of Napoleon as Versailles  does of Louis XIV". From 1856 on, Napoleon III and Eugénie made it their autumn residence, and redecorated some rooms in the Second Empire style.

Present day
Today's visitors can find three distinct museums within the chateau: the apartments themselves; the Museum of the Second Empire; and the National Car Museum (Le Musée de la Voiture), founded in 1927, with a collection of carriages, bicycles, and automobiles.

External links

 Château de Compiègne - official site 
 Panoramic views of the Château de Compiègne

Compiegne
Palaces and residences of Napoleon
Royal residences in France
Compiègne
Ancien Régime French architecture
Neoclassical architecture in France
French Renaissance Revival architecture
Museums in Oise
Historic house museums in Hauts-de-France
Transport museums in France
Art museums and galleries in France
Compiegne
Réunion des Musées Nationaux
Compiègne